Hypetraxx is a German band composed of Cengiz Özmaden, Frank Kuchinke and Jesse B. Foerster.

Discography

Studio albums

Singles

As lead artist

As featured artist

References

German electronic music groups
Musical groups established in 1996
1996 establishments in Germany